Patricia Ofori  (9 June 1981 – 20 April 2011) was a Ghanaian footballer who played as a defender. She has been a member of the Ghana women's national team.

Early life
Ofori was raised in Accra.

College career
Ofori has attended the Alabama A&M University in the United States.

Club career
Ofori has played for Mawuena Ladies in Ghana.

International career
Ofori was a member of the Ghana women's national football team from 2003 to 2007. She was part of the team at the 2003 FIFA Women's World Cup and 2007 FIFA Women's World Cup.

Death
Ofori died on 20 April 2011 in a car accident. Her Ford Mustang collided with a Toyota Tacoma at the intersection of Patterson Lane and Pulaski Pike in the Meridianville area. Her interment was Accra, Ghana in late April 2011.

See also
List of Ghana women's international footballers

References

1981 births
2011 deaths
Footballers from Accra
Ghanaian women's footballers
Women's association football defenders
Alabama A&M Lady Bulldogs soccer players
Ghana women's international footballers
2003 FIFA Women's World Cup players
2007 FIFA Women's World Cup players
Ghanaian expatriate women's footballers
Ghanaian expatriate sportspeople in the United States
Expatriate women's soccer players in the United States
Road incident deaths in Alabama